Piper ornatum, the Celebes pepper, is a species of plant in the family Piperaceae. It is endemic to Indonesia.

References

ornatum
Endemic flora of Sulawesi
Taxa named by N. E. Brown